In Fiji, the Leader of the Opposition (or Opposition Leader) is a senior politician who commands the support of the Official Opposition. The Leader of the Opposition is, by convention, the leader of the largest political party in the Parliament of Fiji that is not in government. This is usually this is the parliamentary leader of the second-largest caucus in Parliament. It did not originate in Fiji but has a long tradition; in British constitutional theory, the Leader of the Opposition must pose a formal alternative to the government, ready to form a government himself should the Prime Minister lose the confidence of the parliament.

Typically the leader of the Opposition is elected by his or her party according to its rules. A new leader may be elected when the incumbent dies, resigns, or is challenged for the leadership.

Description of the office
The Leader of the Opposition is chosen by a vote of all members of Parliament who declare that they do not support the government. But before the adoption of the 2013 Constitution, the Leader of the Opposition was formally appointed by the President. The appointment was not at the president's personal discretion, however, as he was required by the Constitution to appoint the person most acceptable to the majority of the Opposition (defined as members of the House of Representatives who belong to political parties not represented in the Cabinet). In theory, that meant the parliamentary leader of the largest Opposition party. In practice, the person most eligible could decline the office, as was the case between 2001 and 2004, when Mahendra Chaudhry, whose Labour Party held 28 of the 30 Opposition seats in the House of Representatives, adamantly refused to accept the position of Leader of the Opposition, insisting that he and his party wanted representation in the Cabinet instead.  Until he reversed his position late in 2004 (following the collapse of negotiations with Prime Minister Qarase), this forced the President to appoint Mick Beddoes, the sole parliamentary representative of the United General Party, as Leader of the Opposition.

Under the 1997 Constitution, the Leader of the Opposition chose 8 of the 32 members of the Senate, Fiji's upper house of Parliament, and had the right to be consulted about the appointment of the Chief Justice.

List of leaders of the opposition in Fiji (1970–present)

|- style="text-align:center;"
| colspan=9| Vacant (14 May 1987 – 3 April 1992)

|- style="text-align:center;"
| colspan=9| Vacant (3 October 2000 – 3 July 2001)

|- style="text-align:center;"
| colspan=9| Vacant (5 December 2006 – 6 October 2014)

See also
List of political parties in Fiji
House of Representatives of Fiji

Notes

References

Fiji, Leader of the Opposition
Politics of Fiji
Fiji
Leader of the Opposition